The Burial of Atala or The Funeral of Atala (French - Atala au tombeau) is an 1808 oil on canvas painting by Anne-Louis Girodet, showing a scene from the 1801 novella Atala and now in the Louvre Museum. It was commissioned by Louis François Bertin.

References

1808 paintings
Paintings in the Louvre by French artists
Adaptations of works by François-René de Chateaubriand